Paul Martin Raymond (16 November 1945 – 13 April 2019) was an English keyboardist and guitarist, best known for playing in UFO and Michael Schenker Group.

Life and career
Raymond began his musical career in January 1964 as a jazz musician. He later joined Plastic Penny as their keyboardist/vocalist, and replaced Christine McVie (née: Perfect) in British blues band Chicken Shack when she left for a solo career, before she joined Fleetwood Mac. Raymond then joined Savoy Brown as their keyboardist/guitarist. He subsequently recorded with the former Fleetwood Mac guitarist Danny Kirwan, appearing on his first album, Second Chapter, released in 1975.

Raymond was recruited by UFO in 1976 to replace their first keyboardist, Danny Peyronel. He wrote songs for UFO, but because of a previous publishing deal, was not credited for these songs until recent years. When Michael Schenker left UFO, Raymond joined Schenker's new band, MSG, in 1981 and later joined UFO bassist Pete Way's  band, Waysted, in 1983. Raymond worked with Phil Mogg, Andy Parker, along with Schenker and Way, in UFO from 1976 to 1980, 1984–1986, 1993–1998 and 2003–2019.

Raymond was left handed and played guitar with the strings inverted.

He has a daughter named Erica Raymond https://instagram.com/ejraymond

Raymond died from a heart attack on 13 April 2019, aged 73. At the time of his death, UFO had just completed the first leg of what they referred to as their final world tour, dubbed "Last Orders: 50th Anniversary". For the remainder of the tour, Raymond was replaced by Neil Carter, who was also his replacement from 1980 to 1983.

References

1945 births
2019 deaths
English keyboardists
English songwriters
English rock guitarists
English male singers
Musicians from St Albans
UFO (band) members
Michael Schenker Group members
Musicians from Hertfordshire
Savoy Brown members
Chicken Shack members
Waysted members
English male guitarists
British male songwriters